The Taiwan Design Museum is a museum about design in Xinyi District, Taipei, Taiwan. The museum is located at Songshan Cultural and Creative Park.

Transportation
The museum is accessible within walking distance northeast from Sun Yat-sen Memorial Hall Station of the Taipei Metro.

See also
 List of museums in Taiwan
 Songshan Cultural and Creative Park

References

External links

 Facebook Page

Museums with year of establishment missing
Art museums and galleries in Taiwan
Design museums
Museums in Taipei